Patna–Kota Express is a Express train of the Indian Railways, which runs between  the capital of Bihar and  in Rajasthan This train is Famous among students of Bihar.

History

Previously, the train ran between Lucknow and Mathura, later extended up to Patna and then Kota in July 2012.

Arrival and departure

Train number 13237, 13239 depart from Patna Junction at 11:50, reaching Kota Junction the next day at 12:55. Train number 13238, 13240 departs from Kota at 18:10 and reach Patna the next day at 21:20.

Rake/Coach composition
LHB rake

RSA
Rake sharing: 13239/13240

Loco
As both the routes are now fully electrified it is hauled by a Kanpur Electric Loco Shed based WAP-7 for its entire journey.

Loco/Rake reversals
MTJ/ (10);

Schedule

References

External links
Indian Railway Passenger reservation Enquiry
IRCTC Online Passenger Reservation System IRCTC

Express trains in India
Transport in Patna
Rail transport in Bihar
Rail transport in Rajasthan
Rail transport in Uttar Pradesh
Transport in Kota, Rajasthan